The Columbus Region of Ivy Tech Community College serves Bartholomew County, Johnson County, Jackson County, Decatur County, Jennings County, and Shelby County. Other instructional locations include: Franklin, Greensburg, North Vernon, Shelbyville, and Seymour.

Academics 
Associate degrees, Applied associate degrees, and Certificates are awarded.

References 

Col
Educational institutions established in 1963
Education in Bartholomew County, Indiana
1963 establishments in Indiana